Ignat is a Romanian surname that corresponds to the given name Ignat/Ignatius. Notable persons with that name include:

Doina Florica Ignat (1938–2016), Romanian politician
Doina Ignat (born 1968), Romanian rower
Florin Ignat (born 1982), Romanian futsal player
Gheorghe Ignat (born 1983), Romanian mixed martial arts fighter
, Romanian politician, member of parliament 2000–2018
Nestor Ignat, Romanian journalist, writer and graphic artist

See also

Ignatenko
Ignatov
Ignatyev
Ignatów (disambiguation)

Romanian-language surnames